The Charles R. Atwood House is a historic house located at 30 Dean Street in Taunton, Massachusetts.

Description and history 
The Italianate style single family house was built in about 1850 for Charles R. Atwood, treasurer and agent for the Phoenix Manufacturing Co. The house remained in the Atwood family until the 1930s. It is a -story L-shaped, wood-framed structure, with the entry porch at the crook of the L, and a second porch against the left side. The eaves are bracketed, and windows are capped by bracketed lintels. The exterior of the house has clapboard siding.

The house was added to the National Register of Historic Places on July 5, 1984.

See also
National Register of Historic Places listings in Taunton, Massachusetts

References

Houses in Taunton, Massachusetts
National Register of Historic Places in Taunton, Massachusetts
Houses on the National Register of Historic Places in Bristol County, Massachusetts
Italianate architecture in Massachusetts